Syosset is a station on the Long Island Rail Road's Port Jefferson Branch located in Syosset, New York, at Jackson Avenue and Underhill Boulevard, south of New York State Route 25A, but north of Jericho Turnpike and the Long Island Expressway. Syosset's downtown was built around the station. There are no public transportation connections at the station, but taxi service is available.

Location
Syosset station is in the hamlet of the same name in the Town of Oyster Bay.

History
Syosset station was originally built by the Hicksville and Syosset Railroad in 1854. The station's former building was built in 1872. The building's first location was at Lockwood's Grove station, on the former Cedarhurst Cut-off. The LIRR moved the building to Syosset station in 1877, as the Far Rockaway – Lockwood's Grove station had since been abandoned. The building was renovated in 1944, then torn down and replaced in 1948. In 1970 the station was electrified, along with the rest of the Port Jefferson Branch between Mineola and Huntington stations. 

The station was again renovated from October 2018 to June 2019. This renovation included a new station house and a sculpture known as "Sail", designed by Tom Fruin. Digital signage with real-time information was also added to the station.

Transit-oriented development
The Town of Oyster Bay has designated Syosset station as one of its targets for transit-oriented development. Known as the "Syosset Downtown Redevelopment and Revitalization Plan," the project aims to re-create the hamlet's downtown through mixed-use development and improved, human-scale zoning regulations. The master-plan includes suggestions such as removing the grade crossing at Jackson Avenue, creating a pedestrian plaza by eliminating road traffic on a portion of Cold Spring Road, parking reconfiguration, and the building of a community center as ways of focusing growth in the downtown area and reducing unnecessary trips by car.

Station layout
Syosset has two high-level side platforms, each 12 cars long. The station is on a curve, necessitating a wider than normal gap between the platform and train. At places where train doors open, most of the gaps span ten inches or more; some gaps measure 15 inches. Black ice may cause commuters to fall into the gap. On January 30, 1996, in separate incidents, three commuters in a 90-minute period fell into the gap at the station due to icy platform conditions.

To remedy the gap situation, the LIRR has installed platform gap lighting, camera surveillance systems, and new platform sections shifted from the current location. The LIRR has also added platform conductors to monitor train boarding, and is instructing crews to announce the gap at the station and to assist passengers. Further improvements, including changing railroad operation standards and the viable use of retractable gap fillers (such as those used in a few New York City Subway stations) are being examined. The railroad has also retained a consultant to review train operations to suggest further changes.

Some Syosset residents and politicians, such as former Nassau County Presiding Officer Judy Jacobs, insist the best solution to eliminate the gap problem is to force the LIRR to close the Syosset station and reopen the Landia station to the southwest. Landia is on straight track. A mall is being proposed near the Landia station site. Michael Pally, an MTA board member representing Suffolk County and who also works for a real estate firm that represents the company proposing construction of the mall, believes the Syosset station should be closed because more parking spaces would be available at Landia. Opponents of the mall believe that opening Landia while closing Syosset will just be a ruse to direct people to the mall. The Town of Oyster Bay, which controls the Landia station site, is still gathering information before it makes a decision to ask the LIRR to conduct a study.

References

External links

Syosset Scrapbook(Part 7) (Includes Syosset Station Photos and History)
A History of the Syosset Station by Tom Montalbano
AMOTT Interlocking and Syosset Platform Gap (The LIRR Today)
 Station from Jackson Avenue from Google Maps Street View

Syosset, New York
Long Island Rail Road stations in Nassau County, New York
Railway stations in the United States opened in 1854
1854 establishments in New York (state)